Nakhchivan Memorial Museum is a museum in Nakhchivan, Azerbaijan. It offers 1200 exhibits about residents of Nakhchivan and its cultural heritage of Azerbaijan's history.

See also
March Days

External links
The Memorial Museum

Buildings and structures in the Nakhchivan Autonomous Republic
Monuments and memorials in Azerbaijan
History museums in Azerbaijan
Museums established in 2000
Museums in Azerbaijan